Saronikos is a municipality in the East Attica regional unit, Attica, Greece. The seat of the municipality is the town Kalyvia Thorikou. The municipality has an area of 139.099 km2.

Municipality
The municipality Saronikos was formed at the 2011 local government reform by the merger of the following 5 former municipalities, that became municipal units:
Anavyssos
Kalyvia Thorikou
Kouvaras
Palaia Fokaia
Saronida

References

Municipalities of Attica
Populated places in East Attica